Luoyuan railway station is a railway station located in Luoyuan County, Fujian Province, China, on the Wenzhou–Fuzhou Railway operated by the Nanchang Railway Bureau, China Railway Corporation.

References 

Railway stations in Fujian
Railway stations in China opened in 2009